St. John's Lutheran Church Complex is a historic church complex, including two church buildings, a parsonage, and a cemetery, in Auburn, Nebraska, United States. The Old Stone church was built in 1867–1868, and designed by Christian Schwan, a German immigrant. Another church was built in 1903, and designed in the Late Gothic Revival architectural style. A two-story parsonage was completed in 1925. The complex includes a cemetery with over 500 tombstones. The church complex has been listed on the National Register of Historic Places since January 25, 1979.

References

National Register of Historic Places in Nemaha County, Nebraska
Gothic Revival architecture in Nebraska
Churches completed in 1868
Cemeteries in Nebraska
1868 establishments in Nebraska